Hygrocybe cantharellus, commonly known as chanterelle waxy cap, is an agaric (gilled mushroom) in the family Hygrophoraceae. It is found in eastern North America and Australia. The European Hygrocybe lepida was previously referred to this name, but is now known to be distinct.

References

External links

Fungi described in 1822
Fungi of Australia
Fungi of North America
cantharellus
Taxa named by Lewis David de Schweinitz